Earth Shaker Rock is a compilation album, containing songs of the German heavy metal band Warlock and the last four songs coming from Warlock singer Doro Pesch's first two solo albums. It is the last album issued under the Warlock moniker and was released on CD in 1999 by the British label Connoisseur Collection, specialized in compilation albums of various recording artists.

Track listing

References

Warlock (band) albums
1999 compilation albums